Philip Türpitz (born 23 August 1991) is a German professional footballer who plays as a midfielder. He most recently played for Türkgücü München.

References

External links

1991 births
Living people
Association football midfielders
German footballers
Stuttgarter Kickers players
FC Schalke 04 II players
Sportfreunde Lotte players
Chemnitzer FC players
1. FC Magdeburg players
SV Sandhausen players
FC Hansa Rostock players
Türkgücü München players
2. Bundesliga players
3. Liga players
People from Laupheim
Sportspeople from Tübingen (region)
Footballers from Baden-Württemberg